Zlatko Kostić (born 9 August 1973) is a retired football player who played as a midfielder for clubs in Yugoslavia, Spain and Greece. He is now a manager.

Playing career

Club
Born in Titograd, Kostić began his career playing for local side FK Budućnost Podgorica. in 1995, he would join Spanish Segunda División side Écija Balompié for two seasons. The club were relegated to the Segunda División B following the 1996–97 season, and he returned to Budućnost Podgorica. In 1999, Kostić joined Greek Superleague side Panachaiki F.C. for six months. He returned again to Budućnost Podgorica, where he would finish his playing career.

Managerial career
After his playing career ended, Kostić became a football manager. He leads Montenegrin First League side OFK Bar.

References

External links
 
 

1973 births
Living people
Footballers from Podgorica
Association football midfielders
Yugoslav footballers
Montenegrin footballers
Serbia and Montenegro footballers
FK Budućnost Podgorica players
Écija Balompié players
Panachaiki F.C. players
Yugoslav First League players
Second League of Serbia and Montenegro players
First League of Serbia and Montenegro players
Segunda División players
Super League Greece players
Serbia and Montenegro expatriate footballers
Expatriate footballers in Spain
Serbia and Montenegro expatriate sportspeople in Spain
Expatriate footballers in Greece
Serbia and Montenegro expatriate sportspeople in Greece
Montenegrin football managers